

The Weber W-151 was a light aircraft built by the Brazilian manufacturer Campanhia Nacional de Aviões.

Development
Willibald Weber began work on the W-151 in 1962, which flew for the first time in November 1962. The original plan was to build three prototypes. Although the aircraft was superior compared to the Cessna aircraft, series production was not started for cost reasons. 

The W-151 was a strutted shoulder-wing aircraft with conventional tailplane and non-retractable nose wheel landing gear. The aircraft was powered by a Continental IO-520C with 210 kW and was made entirely of metal. The enclosed cabin for up to six people could be entered through a door on the left side.

Specifications

References
Notes

Bibliography

Single-engined tractor aircraft
High-wing aircraft
1960s Brazilian aircraft
Aircraft first flown in 1962
1960s Brazilian civil utility aircraft
W-151